Jiang hu: The Triad Zone (江湖告急) is a 2000 Hong Kong crime comedy film directed by Dante Lam and starring Tony Leung Ka-fai, Sandra Ng, Anthony Wong and Eason Chan.

Plot
News has spread that triad leader Jimmy Yam (Tony Leung Ka-fai) will be assassinated within 24 hours. Yam, who has an exaggerated personality, he would like to use this opportunity to expand his power and influence and sees the true side of people around him, including his wife Sophie (Sandra Ng), counselor Wai (Chan Fai-hung), bodyguard Yue (Roy Cheung), rival Luk See (Robert Siu), triad newcomer Tiger (Samuel Pang), and his sworn brother Jeff (Eric Tsang), a voluntary scapegoat who served in person for Yam, all of whom which have another side which Yam had never known.

Cast and roles
 Tony Leung Ka-fai as Jimmy Yam
 Sandra Ng as Sophie Yam
 Anthony Wong Chau-sang as Master Kwan Wan-cheung
 Eason Chan as Chan Chin-wah
 Jo Kuk as Tiger's girlfriend
 Roy Cheung as Ho Kwun-yue
 Lee Siu-kei as Kei
 Chan Fai-hung as Counselor Wai
 Law Lan as Kei's widow
 Lee San-san as Jo Jo Cheung
 Samuel Pang as Tiger
 Eric Tsang as Jeff
 Chapman To as Tung Tung
 Lee Lik-Chi as Ox Dung
 Richard Ng as London street vendor
 Ann Hui as Sister 13
 Maria Chung sd Ping
 Lam Chi-Sing as Jo Jo's Brother
 Carl Ng as Carl
 Hugo Ng as Big Mouth
 Robert Siu as Luk See

Notes

External links
 IMDb entry
 HK cinemagic entry
 Reviews on brns.com

2000 films
2000s crime comedy films
Hong Kong crime comedy films
Triad films
2000s Cantonese-language films
Films directed by Dante Lam
China Star Entertainment Group films
Films set in Hong Kong
Films shot in Hong Kong
2000 comedy films
2000s Hong Kong films